Klaus D. Kubinger (born May 25, 1949 in Vienna, Austria), is a psychologist as well as a statistician, professor for psychological assessment at the University of Vienna, Faculty of Psychology. His main research work focuses on fundamental research of assessment processes and on application and advancement of Item response theory models (Rasch model). He is also known as a textbook author of psychological assessment on the one hand and on statistics on the other hand.

Biography
Kubinger received 1973 the doctor's degree in psychology (PhD) in Vienna, Austria, and became assistant professor. In 1985 he achieved the postdoctoral lecture qualification of psychology. Since then he is head of the examination subject psychological assessment at the University of Vienna. In 1989 he was graduated as a MSc in statistics. In 1998 he was promoted to a full professor of psychological assessment. From this time on, he is head of the division of psychological assessment and applied psychomterics, which includes a Center of Testing and Consulting.

In 1997 he earned the qualification of a systemic psych-therapist.

Scientific Work
The beginning of Klaus Kubinger's carrier was characterized by applications of the Rasch model (Item response theory) on pertinent psychological tests 
.
Then he developed some non-parametric discriminant analysis 

and an analysis of variance for a two-way layout for rank scaled data
.
Later on the intelligence test-battery AID 

and AID 2

,
respectively, have been established, which is based on (branched-) adaptive testing. There have also been developed several objective personality tests sensu R.B. Cattell 
.
Nowadays his research work focuses on fundamental research of assessment processes (fakability of personality questionnaires,
guessing effects in multiple choice tests 

,
equivalency of computerized or in other cultures transposed tests 
)
and on the advancement of Item response theory models

.

Journal activities
 since 2003 Editor in Chief of Psychological Test and Assessment Modeling
 since 2005 Board member of Journal of Individual Differences
 since 2007 Board member of International Journal of Selection and Assessment

Awards and honours
 2007: Alfred-Binet-Award of the German Society of Psychology.
 2009: Award of the European Association of Psychological Assessment for distinguished contributions to psychological assessment as a science in the years 2004-2008.
 2010: Lifework Award for computerized psychological assessment of the German Society of Psychology.

Publications

Books (selection)
 Kubinger, K.D. (Hrsg.). (1988). Moderne Testtheorie – Ein Abriß samt neuesten Beiträgen [Modern psychometrics – A brief survey with recent contributions]. Munich: Psychologie Verlags Union. 
 Kubinger, K.D. (2009). Psychologische Diagnostik – Theorie und Praxis psychologischen Diagnostizierens  (2nd ed.) [Psychological Assessment – Theory and Practice of Psychological Consulting]. Göttingen: Hogrefe. 
 Rasch, D., Kubinger, K.D. & Yanagida, T. (2011). Statistics in Psychology – Using R and Spss. Chichester: Wiley. 
 Kubinger, K.D., Frebort, M., Khorramdel, L. & Weitensfelder, L. ("Wiener Autorenkollektiv Studienberatungstests") (2012). Self-Assessment: Theorie und Konzepte [Self-Assessment: Theory and Concepts]. Lengerich: Pabst.

Papers (since 2005, selection)
 Kubinger, K.D. (2005). Psychological Test Calibration using the Rasch Model – Some Critical Suggestions on Traditional Approaches. International Journal of Testing, 5, 377-394.
 Kubinger, K.D., Litzenberger, M. & Mrakotsky, C. (2006). Practised intelligence testing based on a modern test conceptualization and its reference to the common intelligence theories. Learning and Individual Differences, 16, 175-193.
 Kubinger, K.D. & Litzenberger, M. (2006). On the shortcomings of a mono-methodical approach to personality assessment.  Individual Differences Research, 4, 139-158.
 Khorramdel, L. & Kubinger, K.D. (2006). The effect of speededness on personality questionnaires – An experiment on applicants within a job recruiting procedure. Psychology Science, 48, 378-397.
 Kubinger, K.D., Wiesflecker, S. & Steindl, R. (2008). A systematic-based interview guide: Its validity and economy in comparison with an unstructured interview approach – Experimental results. Journal of Psychoeducational Assessment, 26, 54-68.
Titscher, A. & Kubinger, K.D. (2008). An Innovative Method for Testing Children's Achievement-Related Reactions. School Psychology International, 29, 452-465.
 Kubinger, K.D. (2009). Application of the Linear Logistic Test Model in Psychometric Research. Educational and Psychological Measurement, 69, 232-244.
 Rasch, D. & Kubinger, K.D. (2009). Designing clinical trials and experiments efficiently with the program package CADEMO. Contemporary Clinical Trials, 30, 354-365.
 Kubinger, K.D. (2009). The technique of objective personality-tests sensu R.B. Cattell nowadays: The Viennese pool of computerized tests aimed at experiment-based assessment of behavior. Acta Psychological Sinica, 41, 1024-1036.
 Kubinger, K.D., Rasch, D. & Yanagida, T. (2009). On designing data-sampling for Rasch model calibrating an achievement test. Psychology Science Quarterly, 51, 370-384.
 Rasch, D. & Kubinger, K.D. (2010). On Optimal Planning and Analysing Empirical Studies – Sequential Testing as a Strategy for Reducing Average Sample Size. Advances in Theory and Application, 3, 43-59.
 Kubinger, K.D., Holocher-Ertl, S., Reif, M., Hohensinn, C. & Frebort, M. (2010). On minimizing guessing effects on multiple-choice items: Superiority of a two solutions and three distractors item format to a one solution and five distractors item format. International Journal of Selection and Assessment, 18, 111-115.
 Kubinger, K.D. & Wolfsbauer, C. (2010). On the risk of certain psycho-technological response options in multiple-choice tests: does a particular personality handicap examinees? European Journal of Psychological Assessment, 26, 302-308.
 Hohensinn, C. & Kubinger, K.D. (2011). Applying Item Response theory methods to examine the impact of different response formats. Educational and Psychological Measurement, 71, 732-746.
 Rasch, D., Kubinger, K.D. & Moder, K. (2011). The two-sample t-test: pre-testing its assumptions does not pay off. Statistical Papers, 52, 219-231.
 Kubinger, K.D., Hohensinn, C., Holocher-Ertl, S. & Heuberger, N. (2011). Applying the LLTM for the determination of children's cognitive age-acceleration function. Psychological Test and Assessment Modeling, 53, 183-191.
 Hohensinn, C. & Kubinger, K.D. (2011). On the impact of missing values on item fit and the model validness of the Rasch model. Psychological Test and Assessment Modeling, 53, 380-393.
 Kubinger, K.D., Hohensinn, C., Hofer, S., Khorramdel, L., Frebort, M., Holocher-Ertl, S., Reif, M. & Sonnleitner, P. (2011). Designing the test booklets for Rasch model calibration in a large scale assessment with reference to numerous moderator variables and several ability dimensions. Educational Research and Evaluation, 17, 483-495.
 Hohensinn, C., Kubinger, K.D., Reif, M., Schleicher, E. & Khorramdel, L. (2011). Analysing item position effects due to test booklet design within large-scale assessment.  Educational Research and Evaluation, 17, 497-509.

External links
 Literature by and about Klaus Kubinger in the catalogue of the German National Library
 Psychological Test and Assessment Modeling
 Website of the AID 2

References

Austrian psychologists
Austrian statisticians
Academic staff of the University of Vienna
Scientists from Vienna
1949 births
Living people
Quantitative psychologists